Shandong Taishan Football Club is a professional football club that currently participates in the Chinese Super League under licence from the Chinese Football Association (CFA). The team is based in Jinan, Shandong and their home stadium is the Jinan Olympic Sports Center Stadium that has a seating capacity of 56,808. Their current majority shareholder is Shandong Electric Power Group Corporation, the biggest supplier of electric energy in Shandong province and itself part of the State Grid Corporation of China. "Luneng" is the name of Luneng Group, now another subsidiary corporation of State Grid Corporation of China; Lu is a nickname for Shandong, from the ancient state of Lu, while neng means "energy." The last part of the club name derives from Mount Tai.

The club's predecessor was called Shandong Provincial team who were founded on April 10, 1956 while the current professional football team was established on December 2, 1993. They were one of the founding members of the first fully professional top-tier league in China. Since then they have gone on to win their first league title in the 1999 league season. They have continued to win domestic silverware with the 2006, 2008, 2010, 2021 league titles, making them one of the most successful Chinese football teams.

According to Forbes, Shandong are the 5th most valuable football team in China, with a team value of $126 million, and an estimated revenue of $24 million in 2015. In 2015, Beijing Guoan, Guangzhou Evergrande and Shandong Luneng Taishan were the only Chinese sports clubs with at least 5 million followers on Weibo.

History

Early club era
The club was founded on 10 April 1956 by the local Shandong Province government, to participate in the recently established and expanding Chinese football league, where the team originally named themselves Shandong Provincial team. Shandong took part in the 1957 league season, where they started within the second tier and finished bottom within the group stages. The following season saw an improvement from the team, finishing third within their group, however participation within the league became sporadic as the management decided to concentrate the team's efforts on the multi-sport event Chinese National Games. Participating within the 1965 Chinese National Games, the club ultimately finished ninth within the tournament. The following season, any attempt to return to the league was halted for several seasons due to the Chinese Cultural Revolution.

When the league started back up again in 1973, Shandong were allowed to be included in the top tier and finished ninth at the end of the campaign. As the seasons progressed, they established themselves as regulars within the league, however the management still wished to compete within the Chinese National Games and entered a team in the 1979 tournament which they won, beating Beijing 3–1 in the final. The success of that tournament acted as a springboard for the team, and Shandong would experience finish as runners-up of the 1981 and 1982 league campaigns. The momentum Shandong showed at the start of the decade quickly faded, and by the end of the decade they had experienced their first ever relegation, finishing in the bottom positions for the 1989 league season. Unfortunately for Shandong, they were once again relegated the following season and sent down to the third tier.

The club's time within the third division did not last very long, and they immediately won the division title and promotion at the end of the 1991 league season. The following campaign saw the Chinese Football Association decide to make Chinese football fully professional, and this seemed to spur on the club, as they came third within the division and guaranteed promotion to the first fully professional top-tier league, the 1994 Chinese Jia-A League. On 2 December 1993, Shandong football club became fully professional, gathered sponsorship and changed their name to Shandong Taishan Football Club. On 29 January 1994, Jinan City, the city government sponsored and participated in the club's management, changing its name to Shandong Jinan Taishan Football Club to accommodate this.

Professionalism
Shandong would be one of the founding teams to participate within the inaugural fully professional 1994 Chinese Jia-A League season; however, the owners quickly ran into financial problems with the improved player wages and added costs of running a professional club, which saw players often paid late. The lack of funds also saw the club unable to sign any foreign imports, making them one of the few teams in the league without any foreign players within their roster. To add to the club's problems, several veterans who established the club within the league such as Wang Dongning and Leng Bo left the team at the end of the season. On 3 April 1995, the club changed its name to Jinan Taishan Football Club to accommodate their sponsors, however their financial problems still remained the same and they were unable to bring any new players into the squad. Despite this, manager Yin Tiesheng promoted from within, with players such as Li Xiaopeng and Liu Yue given a chance. However, it was the emergence of strikers Su Maozhen and Tang Xiaocheng which impressed the club's supporters the most, especially once Shandong defeated the recently crowned league champions Shanghai Greenland Shenhua in the 1995 Chinese FA Cup held in Nanjing. After the victory, Shandong General Tobacco (Group) Co., Ltd. became interested in the club and, on 2 March 1996, took control of the team, investing 6.5 million yuan into the club. With the continued investment from the Jinan City government as well, the club were on a sure financial footing, and with Su Maozhen becoming the league's top goal scorer and the team reaching another cup final again in 1996, things looked to have improved for the team, despite losing the final to Beijing Guoan 4–1 in Beijing.

First foreign head coach
On 4 December 1997, the club held a consultation with the Shandong Electric Power Group Corporation and, on 5 January 1998, Shandong Electric Power Group Corporation became the majority shareholders of the club and changed the club's name to Shandong Luneng Football Club. While the Jinan City government still had significant shareholdings within the club, the new majority shareholders decided that the team needed a new direction and brought in the club's first ever foreign coach in Kim Jung-Nam at the beginning of the 1998 league season, after Yin Tiesheng wasn't able to improve upon the previous season's results. Kim came into Shandong with a reputation of having led South Korea into the 1986 FIFA World Cup, their first World Cup in over 32 years. He dramatically changed the team's style of play and emphasized attacking football, and new signing Deng Lejun from Beijing Guo'an thrived on this, scoring seven goals. Kim's style, however, didn't bring the team many wins, and he resigned later in the season, while Yin Tiesheng returned to manage the team away from relegation.

First league title
On 25 December 1998, former Yugoslavian national team coach Slobodan Santrač joined Shandong as their new manager for the start of the 1999 league season. With key foreign signings in Serbian goalkeeper Saša Petrović, striker Luis Romero combining with now established Chinese international Su Maozhen along with the emergence of Li Xiaopeng, Shandong had the backbone of a team that surprised many to go on to the final day of the season and defeat Chongqing Longxin 5–0 to claim their first ever league title. Several days later, the club would achieve their first ever domestic cup double when they beat Dalian Wanda 4–3 on aggregate to clinch the 1999 Chinese FA Cup, which resulted in Santrač personally being awarded the Chinese Coach of the Year award. The 1999 FA Cup victory would unfortunately be tainted by controversy when, on 18 February 2013, it was confirmed by the Chinese police that former Chinese football association Head of refereeing Zhang Jianqiang was paid 400,000 Yuan by the club to select the referees for their fixtures in the tournament. Shandong would later be fined one million Yuan by the Chinese football association for this transgression.

For the start of the 2000 league season, striker Casiano Delvalle and midfielder Charles Wittl were brought in to replace the exiting Luis Romero. Unfortunately for Shandong, they got off to the worst possible start to the season by losing their first game of the new campaign to the newly promoted side Yunnan Hongta 1–0. The club continued to struggle with defending their title and by the 16 July clash with Qingdao Etsong Hainiu, the pressure had already seen Santrač refuse to speak to the media despite Shandong actually winning the game 4–2. With the title already gone from Shandong and Santrač appearing to have lost control of the team he was forced to resign on 13 September 2000, while youth team coach Đoko Koković temporarily took over the team for the remainder of the season.

Dong Gang
In preparation for the 2001 season, speculations grew. Croatian Miroslav Blažević was rumoured to become the new head coach for the club's first team. After the end of the 2000 season, Shao Kenan was forced to step down as general manager and Dong Gang became his replacement on 2 November 2000. Dong's first decision was to hire Russian Boris Ignatiev. With Casiano Delvalle being the previous season's top goal scorer and the introduction of foreign veterans such as Gabriel Mendoza, José Oscar Herrera and Serhiy Nahornyak, expectations were high for Shandong. However, the team started the new season badly, losing 0–1 to newly-promoted side Shaanxi National Power in their opening match. Shandong Luneng then experienced one of the most devastating defeats in their history in the continental 2000–01 Asian Club Championship in March 2001, where they lost 6–2 to Júbilo Iwata and then 6–0 to the Suwon Samsung Bluewings. These were the first of a series of Shandong's humiliating defeats on the international stage, affecting the team's morale. In the summer of 2001, Nii Lamptey and later Márcio Santos were signed in an effort to halt the losing streak. Lamptey was instrumental in helping Shandong regain confidence and they finished their remaining matches strongly with 9 wins and 1 draw, including 7 straight wins towards the end of the 2001 season.

Another Russian, Valeri Nepomniachi, who achieved great success at the 1990 FIFA World Cup with Cameroon, was appointed as Shandong's new head coach on 18 December 2001. Under his reign, the team's performance improved initially and finished 4th in the 2002 season, their second-best result since 1994. Nepomniachi was to stay for another year. However, Shandong struggled throughout the season and only finished 12th, barely avoiding relegation. Despite being named in a match-fixing scandal, Dong stayed as the club's general manager for another 2 years until November 2005, when he left his position to Kang Mengjun. Along the way, he made the decision to hire Ljubiša Tumbaković, who was to become Shandong's most successful manager.

Ljubiša Tumbaković
On 7 January 2004, Ljubiša Tumbaković was brought in as head coach for the rebranded 2004 Chinese Super League and, with the signing of Chinese international striker Li Jinyu along with the emergence of Han Peng, the club were able to win the 2004 FA Cup by beating Sichuan First City in the final. With the continued investment coming from the signing of another Chinese international in Zheng Zhi, Shandong looked to provide a better showing in the club's second outing in the 2005 AFC Champions League, where they reached the quarter-finals before being humbled by eventual winners Al-Ittihad (Jeddah) 8–3 on aggregate. The capitulation against Al-Ittihad, which saw Tumbakovic and players Zheng Zhi as well as Predrag Pazin sent off for abusive and violent conduct, would ultimately affect the team's performance within the league, and see them lose the 2005 league title, eventually coming third.

In the 2006 Chinese Super League campaign, Tumbaković looked to overcome the disappointment of the previous season, and with the club not in the Champions League Shandong could concentrate on winning a league and cup double. With talented and motivated young players that included Cui Peng, Zhou Haibin and Wang Yongpo (along with Zheng Zhi personally winning the 2006 most valuable player award and Li Jinyu gaining the top goal scorer award), Shandong breezed to the title with several games remaining and, at the time, the highest points and goal total in Chinese football league history. After gaining his MVP title, Zheng Zhi would interest then-top tier English club Charlton Athletic, who he initially joined on loan before making his move permanent. His departure would see Shandong struggle in the 2007 AFC Champions League, and they couldn't improve upon their previous ACL results; despite gaining 13 points they were knocked out of the competition in the group stage by Seongnam Ilhwa Chunma, who finished above them on goal difference. The continental exit would once again repercuss into the league and see Shandong unable to defend their title. Without the Champions League to contend with, Tumbaković was able to regroup his team again and win the 2008 league campaign on the final day of the season when a 0–0 draw against Guangzhou Pharmaceutical was enough to clinch the title.

On 7 February 2009, the team's Chinese international footballer Zhou Haibin signed for top tier Dutch club PSV Eindhoven on a free transfer. His sudden departure gave Shandong a confusing and difficult pre-season preparation, which saw them start the 2009 AFC Champions League with a 3–0 defeat to Gamba Osaka on 10 March 2009. This detrimental start would ultimately see the club unable to reach the knockout stage once again under Tumbaković. The club's league form also suffered, and after the team came fourth in their attempt to defend their title, the Shandong management decided to let Tumbaković go.

Sun Guoyu
On 21 November 2009, Sun Guoyu came in as the new general manager of the club, and his first assignment was to hire Branko Ivanković on 16 December 2009 as the club's new head coach. Established Chinese international player Deng Zhuoxiang joined the team before the start of the 2010 league campaign in hopes of revitialising the team's midfield. Once again Shandong's continental campaign saw them knocked out in the group stage of the 2010 AFC Champions League; however, unlike previous seasons, Shandong were able to recover from this disappointment, and with the inclusion of Julio César de León during the season, were able to win the league title. The club's defence of their league title saw promising youngster Zhang Chi seriously injured in the first game of the 2011 league season. The repercussion of his injury saw Shandong have a slow start to the season and on the verge of being eliminated once again in the group stage of the Champions League, which resulted in Ivanković resigning on 5 May 2011, two days after losing 2–1 to Jeonbuk Hyundai Motors. Rajko Magić took on the helm of head coach, however he was sacked after a series of losses and replaced by the head coach of the club's football school Manuel Barbosa on a caretaker basis, where he guided the team to a runners-up spot in the 2011 Chinese FA Cup.

On 6 January 2012, Dutch coach Henk ten Cate was appointed as the new manager of the team. It was hoped that with his experience in previously managing Ajax, the birthplace of total football, he would enforce a faster, more free-flowing playing style. However, Henk ten Cate experimented with youth and alienated experienced regulars in Han Peng, Wang Yongpo and Liu Jindong, while the youngsters became overwhelmed with the increase of competitiveness. With the club's playmaker Roda Antar out injured, the management decided to sign experienced players in Du Wei, Simão Mate Junior, José Ortigoza and Leonardo Pisculichi. Henk ten Cate would eventually call back Wang Yongpo and Han Peng into the team, however by then the club were flirting with relegation and had been knocked out of the FA Cup. Henk ten Cate would resign on 6 September 2012, and was replaced by Chinese coach Wu Jingui, with Ten Cate stating he had left for personal reasons, with the monotonous daily life in Taishan and living separated from his family being the main signifiers.

Controversies off the field would ultimately summarize Sun Guoyu's reign as general manager when on 6 October 2010 the Ministry of Public Security of the People's Republic of China would confirm the arrests of former Chinese Football Association vice chairman Xie Yalong for accepting bribes as well as his knowledge match-fixing during his tenure. While under arrest he would claim that Shandong paid him 200,000 Yuan to select the referee for the 26 August 2006 league game against Beijing Guoan, played at Shandong's home stadium in a match they won 1–0 on their way to clinching the 2006 league championship. The former Head of Refereeing at the Chinese FA, Zhang Jianqiang, would corroborate this story and also claimed that he was paid 400,000 Yuan as a "thank you" from the club for his previous refereeing selections during his tenure. On 18 February 2013, the Chinese Football Association disciplinary committee found Shandong guilty of violating the regulations of the sport and fined them one million Yuan. On 25 December 2013, Sun Guoyu was replaced by Liu Yu as the new general manager of the team.

Cuca
On 22 December 2013, Shandong Luneng announced that Brazilian former footballer Cuca would become the new coach of the team. In 2013, Shandong was eliminated in the AFC Champions League group stage and finished fourth in the Chinese Super League. On 22 November 2014, Ryan McGowan's last-gasp header helped the team defeat Jiangsu Sainty and win the Chinese FA Cup in dramatic fashion, entering next year's Champions League. In 2015, Cuca's team failed to qualify from the group stage of the Champions League again, but finished third in the domestic league, earning the chance to participate in the 2016 AFC Champions League qualification stage.

Mano Menezes and Felix Magath
In December 2015, former Brazilian national team manager Mano Menezes became Shandong's new head coach, assisted by Li Xiaopeng.

On 21 April 2016, with a 1–0 victory over Japanese side Sanfrecce Hiroshima, Shandong returned to the knockout stage of the AFC Champions League after an 11-year absence with one match of the group stage still remaining. On 25 May, they defeated Sydney FC to reach the quarter-finals. However, bad results in the domestic league led to Menezes' resignation on 7 June 2016. Felix Magath was appointed the next day.

Li Xiaopeng
In 2017, Li Xiaopeng became the new manager after Magath was dismissed. Li would lead the club to several years of contention. This included a third-placed finish in the 2018 Chinese Super League and two Chinese FA Cup finals, winning the trophy in 2020 and finishing as runner-up in 2019.

Hao Wei 
After Li Xiaopeng, Hao Wei became the new manager of Shandong Taishan in 2020. The team won CSL in 2021, and won the FA Cup in 2020 and 2021. In the early 2023, Taishan won the FA Cup of 2022, while this is the 8th time for Taishan to win FA Cup.

Kit manufacturers
With the start of professionalism in the 1994 league season Shandong were allowed to now gain sponsorship and foreign investment. Adidas would provide their kit from 1994 until 2001 until Mizuno took over from 2002 until 2004. Nike started to provide the kits from 2005 and in 2011 they extended their association with the club along with the Chinese Super League when they signed a 10-year deal to provide all the apparel for the whole league.

Affiliated clubs
  Júbilo Iwata (since 2005)
  Adelaide United (since 2008)
  São Paulo (since 2013)

Current squad

First team squad

Reserve squad
The following players were called up for the 2022 AFC Champions League group stage matches between 15 and 30 April 2022.

Retired numbers

12 – Club Supporters (the 12th Man) retired in February 2017.

On loan

Coaching staff

Honours

League
Chinese Super League:
 Winners (4): 2006, 2008, 2010, 2021
Chinese Jia-A League (1994–2003)
 Winners: 1999

Cup
Chinese FA Cup:
 Winners (8): 1995, 1999, 2004, 2006, 2014, 2020, 2021, 2022
Chinese Super League Cup
 Winners: 2004
Chinese FA Super Cup
 Winners: 2015

Reserve team
Chinese Super League Reserve League Champions: 2006, 2010, 2011, 2012, 2013, 2014, 2015
Coca-Cola Olympic League Champions: 2000
Coca-Cola Olympic League Champions: 2001

Youth team
U19 team:
National U19 Youth League Champions: 2009
Nike Youth League Champions; U19 Winners Cup Winners: 2005

U17 team:
National U17 Youth League Champions: 2001, 2003, 2005, 2007, 2010
Adidas Youth League Champions; U17 Winners Cup Winners: 2004
Nike Youth League Champions: 2005
Adidas Youth League Champions: 2006
Adidas Youth League Champions: 2007
U17 Winners Cup Winners: 2008

U15 team:
National U15 Youth League Champions: 2005, 2006, 2007, 2008, 2013
Nike Cup Winners: 2001
Nike Cup Winners: 2002
Adidas Youth League Champions: 2004
Nike Youth League Champions: 2005
Adidas Youth League Champions; U15 FA Cup Winners: 2006
Adidas Youth League Champions; U15 FA Cup Winners; Nike Cup Winners: 2007
Adidas Youth League Champions; U15 Winners Cup Winners: 2008

Results

All-time league rankings

As of the end of 2020 season.

no Division 2 league game in 1959, 1961–63, Shandong Did not compete in 1964;no league games in 1966–72, 1975;
:  in group stage
:  in final group stage
:  in South League
:  Promoted to 1994 Jia-A League
:  Entered the 1996–97 Asian Cup Winners' Cup but withdrew
Key

 Pld = Played
 W = Games won
 D = Games drawn
 L = Games lost
 F = Goals for
 A = Goals against
 Pts = Points
 Pos = Final position

 DNQ = Did not qualify
 DNE = Did not enter
 NH = Not Held
- = Does Not Exist
 R1 = Round 1
 R2 = Round 2
 R3 = Round 3
 R4 = Round 4

 F = Final
 SF = Semi-finals
 QF = Quarter-finals
 R16 = Round of 16
 Group = Group stage
 GS2 = Second Group stage
 QR1 = First Qualifying Round
 QR2 = Second Qualifying Round
 QR3 = Third Qualifying Round

International results
As of 25 June 2019

On neutral venue Shandong score is counted first
Key
 (H) = Home
 (A) = Away
 (N) = Neutral

International players

China PR
 Cui Peng
 Deng Zhuoxiang
 Dai Lin
 Du Wei
 Gao Yao
 Geng Xiaofeng
 Guan Zhen
 Han Peng
 Hao Junmin
 Hao Wei
 Jiao Zhe
 Jin Jingdao
 Liu Binbin
 Li Jinyu
 Li Leilei
 Li Ming
 Li Xiaopeng
 Liu Jindong
 Liu Yang
 Liu Yue
 Lü Zheng
 Shu Chang
 Song Lihui
 Su Maozhen
 Wang Dalei
 Wang Dongning
 Wang Gang

 Wang Liang
 Wang Qiang
 Wang Tong
 Wang Xiaolong
 Wang Yongpo
 Wu Hao
 Xu Yang
 Yang Xu
 Yuan Weiwei
 Zhang Wenzhao
 Zhao Mingjian
 Zheng Zheng
 Zheng Zhi
 Zhou Haibin
 Zong Lei

AFC
 Ryan McGowan
 Roda Antar

CAF
  Ricardo da Silva
  Nii Lamptey
  Mourtala Diakité
  Simão Mate Junior
  Papiss Cissé

CONCACAF
  Julio César de León

CONMEBOL
 Walter Montillo
 Gil
 Jucilei
 Vágner Love
 Márcio Santos
 Diego Tardelli
 Gabriel Mendoza
 Casiano Delvalle
 José Ortigoza
 José Oscar Herrera
 Luis Romero
 Alejandro Cichero

UEFA
 Marouane Fellaini
 Erik Yakhimovich
 Amir Osmanović
 Predrag Pažin
 Nicolas Ouédec
  Graziano Pellè
 Saša Petrović
 Ionel Dănciulescu
 Marius Niculae
 Sergei Kiriakov
 Nikola Malbaša
 Aleksandar Živković
 Marinko Galič
 Serhiy Nahornyak

References

External links
 Official Site 

 
Chinese Super League clubs
Association football clubs established in 1993
1993 establishments in China
Sport in Shandong